Powerhaul may refer to:

The General Electric PowerHaul P616 internal combustion engine
The General Electric/Tulomsas PowerHaul freight locomotive built for Freightliner UK as the Class 70, and also for the Turkish State Railways